The Battle of Ilopango Airport was a military engagement fought at the Ilopango International Airport in El Salvador in late January 1981. The battle was a part of the Salvadoran Civil War. It was fought between soldiers of the Salvadoran Air Force and guerrillas of the Farabundo Martí National Liberation Front.

Background 

On October 15, 1979, the Salvadoran Civil War began with a coup being staged against the President, Carlos Humberto Romero. After the coup, the Revolutionary Government Junta of El Salvador was established and in 1980, the Farabundo Martí National Liberation Front engaged in a guerrilla war against the government.

Battle 

In late January 1981, FMLN guerrillas launched the Final Offensive. As a part of the offensive, the FMLN attacked the Ilopango International Airport which was recently converted into a Salvadoran Air Force base with the opening of the Comalapa International Airport in January 1980. The guerrillas primary goal was to damage infrastructure as to hamper the efforts of the government in stopping the FMLN. As a result, aircraft and helicopters were the primary target of the attack.

The Air Force retained control of the airport and the FMLN retreated but the Air Force lost 14 UH-1H helicopters, 5 Dassault Ouragans, and 3 C-47s.

Aftermath 

The attack on the Ilopango Airport was one of 439 acts of sabotage carried out by the FMLN during the Final Offensive from January to September 1981. The United States estimated the total damages cost $98 million

As a direct result of the attack, newly inaugurated US President Ronald Reagan called the FMLN attacks a "communist plot" and signed an executive order on February 1 authorizing $55 million in emergency military aid to be sent to the government of El Salvador.

References 

Salvadoran Civil War
Conflicts in 1981
1981 in El Salvador
Battles involving El Salvador
Military operations involving airports